Estonia has participated in the Eurovision Young Dancers 4 times since its debut in 1993.

Participation overview

See also
Estonia in the Eurovision Song Contest
Estonia in the Eurovision Young Musicians

External links 
 Eurovision Young Dancers

Countries in the Eurovision Young Dancers